Firebirds is a 1968 album by two American jazz musicians, Prince Lasha (alto saxophone, flute, alto clarinet) and Sonny Simmons (alto saxophone, English horn). Other participating musicians in this album were bassist Buster Williams, drummer Charles Moffett and vibraphonist Bobby Hutcherson.

Reception
The album was praised by critics, and Scott Yanow from Allmusic gave it five stars as an AMG pick.

Track listing

Personnel
 Prince Lasha - alto saxophone, alto clarinet, flute
 Sonny Simmons - alto saxophone, english horn
 Bobby Hutcherson - vibraphone
 Buster Williams - bass
 Charles Moffett - drums

References 

Free jazz albums
1968 albums
Prince Lasha albums
Sonny Simmons albums
Contemporary Records albums
Original Jazz Classics albums